The Samuel Eliot Morison Award for Naval Literature is for literature about the United States Navy. The award was created in 1982 by the New York Commandery of the Naval Order of the United States, who administers and chooses the winner which is a significant book on naval history from the prior year.

The prize is named for Rear Admiral Samuel Eliot Morison, a military historian.

Awardees
Sources:

Samuel Eliot Morison Award for Naval Literature

 1983 Samuel Eliot Morison, honorary on launch of new award 
 1984 Victor H. Krulak, First to Fight: An Inside View of the U.S. Marine Corps
 1987 Ivan Musicant, Battleship at War: The Epic Story of the USS Washington
 1988 Michael A. Palmer, Stoddert's War: Naval Operations during the Quasi-war with France, 1798-1801
 1989 John F. Lehman, Command of the Seas: Building the 600 Ship Navy
 1992 Clark G. Reynolds, Admiral John H. Towers: The Struggle for Naval Air Supremacy
 1993 Eugene B. Fluckey, Thunder Below!: The USS Barb Revolutionizes Submarine Warfare in World War II  
 1995 John B. Lundstrom, The First Team and the Guadalcanal Campaign: Naval Fighter Combat from August to November 1942
 1997 Joseph H. Alexander, Storm Landings: Epic Amphibious Battles in the Central Pacific
 1998 Ivan Musicant, Empire by Default: The Spanish–American War and the Dawn of the American Century
 1999 Edward L. Beach, Jr., Salt and Steel: Reflections of a Submariner
 2000 Edwin H. Simmons, Dog Company Six
 2001 Donald Chisolm, Waiting for Dead Men's Shoes: Origins and Development of the U.S. Navy's Officer Personnel System, 1793-1941
 2002 Norman Friedman, Seapower As Strategy: Navies and National Interests
 2003 John F. Lehman, On Seas of Glory: Heroic Men, Great Ships, and Epic Battles of the American Navy
 2004 James D. Hornfischer, The Last Stand of the Tin Can Sailors
 2005 Michael Walling, Bloodstained Sea: The U.S. Coast Guard in the Battle of the Atlantic, 1941-1944
 2006 Joseph F. Callo, John Paul Jones: America's First Sea Warrior
 2007 Ian W. Toll, Six Frigates: Epic History of Founding of the US Navy
 2008 George C. Daughan, If by Sea: Forging of the US Navy
 2009 James L. Nelson, George Washington's Secret Navy: How the American Revolution Went to Sea
 2010 James Scott, The Attack on the Liberty: The Untold Story of Israel's Deadly 1967 Assault on a U.S. Spy Ship
 2011 Robert Gandt, The Twilight Warriors: The Deadliest Naval Battle of WWII
 2012 Elliot Carlson, Joe Rochefort's War: The Odyssey of the Codebreaker Who Outwitted Yamamoto at Midway
 2013 Walter R. Borneman, The Admirals: Nimitz, Halsey, Leahy, and King — The Five-Star Admirals Who Won the War at Sea
 2014 Jack Cheevers, Act of War: Lyndon Johnson, North Korea, and the Capture of the Spy Ship Pueblo
 2015 Craig L. Symonds, Neptune: The Allied Invasion of Europe and the D-Day Landings
 2016 Tim McGrath, Give Me a Fast Ship: The Continental Navy and America's Revolution at Sea
 2017 Richard Snow,  Iron Dawn:  The Monitor, the Merrimack, and the Civil War Sea Battle that Changed History
 2018 John F. Wukovits, Tin Can Titans: The Heroic Men and Ships of World War II's Most Decorated Navy Destroyer Squadron
 2019 Hampton Sides, On Desperate Ground: The Marines at The Reservoir, the Korean War's Greatest Battle
 2020–2021 M. Ernest Marshall, Rear Admiral Herbert V. Wiley: A Career in Airships and Battleships
 2022 Paul Stillwell, Battleship Commander: The Life of Vice Admiral Willis A. Lee Jr.

Samuel Eliot Morison Award for Distinguished Contribution to Naval Literature
 Thomas B. Buell, The Quiet Warrior: A Biography of Admiral Raymond A. Spruance

References

1982 establishments in the United States
Awards established in 1982
American non-fiction literary awards
Military literary awards